"In My Heart" is a song by Scottish band Texas, released as the second single from their second studio album, Mothers Heaven (1991). It reached number 74 on the UK Singles Chart, where it remains the band's lowest-charting single. Elsewhere, the song reached number 32 in New Zealand and number 44 in France, and it was the group's second single to chart in the United States, reaching number 14 on the Billboard Modern Rock Tracks chart.

Track listings
UK 7-inch single and Australasian CD single
 "In My Heart"
 "Is What I Do Wrong?"

UK 12-inch and CD single
 "In My Heart"
 "Is What I Do Wrong?"
 "You Gave Me Love"
 "In My Heart" (remix)

Charts

References

Texas (band) songs
1991 singles
1991 songs
Mercury Records singles
Songs written by Johnny McElhone
Songs written by Sharleen Spiteri